Pregnancy-specific beta-1-glycoprotein 6 is a protein that in humans is encoded by the PSG6 gene.

References

Further reading